The People's Liberation Army Strategic Support Force Information Engineering University (IEU) is a Chinese military university in Zhengzhou, Henan, affiliated with the People's Liberation Army. It was established in 1999. Before that, it was run under the name of the PLA Information Engineering Institute.

The name Zhengzhou Information Science and Technology Institute is used as a cover by researchers from the university, when they wish to hide their affiliation with the Chinese military. The name Zhengzhou Institute of Surveying and Mapping has been used for a similar purpose – that institute, officially known as the PLA Institute of Surveying and Mapping, was integrated into the PLA Information Engineering University in 1999.

It is reputed to be a center for information warfare research.

See also 

 Chinese information operations and information warfare

References 

 
Military academies of China
Educational institutions established in 1999
1999 establishments in China
People's Liberation Army Strategic Support Force
Universities and colleges in Zhengzhou